A Thousand Suns World Tour was the worldwide sixth concert tour by American rock band Linkin Park. The tour supported the band's fourth studio album A Thousand Suns. The tour ranked 35th in Pollstar's "Top 50 Worldwide Tour (Mid-Year)", earning over 20 million dollars.

Background
Linkin Park announced their upcoming world tour while doing press for their latest LP, A Thousand Suns. Vocalist Chester Bennington stated: "At this point we're writing such great music that I almost want to go do 50 shows around the world and then get right back into making another record. Once the ball starts rolling, it's all I want. It's like a drug."

During an interview with Streetdate Radio, Bennington expressed how odd it felt to begin the tour in South America, even though they are not well known in that region. He further stated that although Linkin Park sell more records in North America, they are more "well known" in other territories. As a band, it did not feel odd to begin in these territories first. During the same interview, he announced the band will play in North America beginning in January 2011.

Opening acts

Attaque 77 (Argentina)
The Futureheads (Europe, select dates)
Does It Offend You, Yeah? (England) (North America, select dates)
DJ Bliss (United Arab Emirates)
Quami & The Halvot (Israel)
Dead Letter Circus (Sydney, Melbourne)

Sleep Walker (Perth)
CNBLUE (Chiba)
The Art (Brisbane, Melbourne, Canberra)
The Prodigy (North America, select dates)
FYE (North America, select dates)
Pendulum (North America, select dates)
Circa Survive (Phoenix, Dallas)
Paper Tongues (Phoenix, Dallas, Houston)

Setlist

Additional notes
During concerts in South America, "Bleed It Out" was performed after "Crawling"
During the concert at Hayarkon Park in Tel Aviv, Israel, the band performed Bob Marley's "No Woman, No Cry".
During the concert at The Roundhouse in London, England, the band covered Adele's "Rolling in the Deep". Later it was released as a Promotional single from the live EP iTunes Festival 2011.
On October 25, while in Paris, the band decided to perform "A Place For My Head" (after "Crawling") to celebrate the release of their debut album Hybrid Theory, 10 years and a day ago.

Tour dates

Festivals and other miscellaneous performances

Cancellations and rescheduled shows

Cancellations
Lead singer, Chester Bennington, fell ill cancelling three shows and rescheduling two from the North American leg of the tour. Originally, Bennington played a few shows not feeling well; doctors then advised him to stop playing, or the effects could have worsened.. Doctors tested Bennington for different illnesses, including H1N1. While in the process for testing for H1N1, complications arose, worsening his state. Eventually it emerged that he did not have the H1N1 virus, but a similar virus. However,  Linkin Park were caused to cancel five shows due to this illness. Two of the five cancellations from the tour were able to be rescheduled, in Houston and Dallas. Uncasville and Cincinnati were later compensated during the 2012 Honda Civic Tour.

During Linkin Park's Asia tour, Bennington injured his shoulder and doctors advised him to undergo surgery, canceling the band's final show in Pensacola Beach, Florida for the tour and thus ending tour.

Box office score data

Broadcasts and recordings
Throughout the tour, the band will provide an official bootleg recording of each concert after the performance. The band states this is a way to show their fans appreciation for the energy during each concert. Those who attended the show will be able to download the show for free while others can purchase the show on the band's official website. The concert at the Madison Square Garden in New York City was filmed and was broadcast on Fuse TV on February 18, 2011.

Personnel
 Chester Bennington – vocals, rhythm guitar, percussion
 Rob Bourdon – drums, percussions
 Brad Delson – lead guitar, backing vocals, keyboards, percussion
 Dave "Phoenix" Farrell – bass, backing vocals, keyboards
 Joe Hahn – turntables, synthesizer, samples, backing vocals
 Mike Shinoda – vocals, rhythm guitar, lead guitar, keyboards, rapping

References

Linkin Park concert tours
2010 concert tours
2011 concert tours